Bathoceleus hyphalus is an extinct bird discovered in the Bahamas.  It is believed to be a primitive woodpecker.

References

Picidae
Pliocene birds of North America